Andreas Milan Gerhard Philippi (born 4 July 1965) is a German surgeon and politician of the Social Democratic Party (SPD) who has been serving as State Minister of Social Affairs, Labour, Health and Equality in the government of Lower Saxony since 2023. He previously was a member of the Bundestag from the state of Lower Saxony from 2021 to 2022.

Early life and education
Philippi was born 1965 in the West German city of Marburg and studied medicine at the University of Goettingen. From 2009, he practiced at a community health center ib Herzberg am Harz.

Political career
Philippi entered the SPD in 1982 and became member of the Bundestag in the 2021 elections, representing the Göttingen district. In parliament, he served on the Health Committee.

Other activities
 German Red Cross (DRK), Member

References 

Living people
1965 births
 People from Marburg
Social Democratic Party of Germany politicians
Members of the Bundestag 2021–2025
21st-century German politicians

Government ministers of Germany
Members of the Bundestag for Lower Saxony